Fatma Müge Göçek is a Turkish sociologist and professor at the University of Michigan. She wrote the book Denial of Violence in 2015 concerning the prosectution of Armenians in the Ottoman Empire and Turkey, for which she received the Mary Douglas award for best book from the American Sociological Association. In 2017, she won a Distinguished Faculty Achievement Award from the university.

Biography 
Having obtained both her BSc and MSc at the Bogaziçi University in Istanbul, she went to Paris to learn French. In 1981, she moved to the Princeton University from where she received an additional MSc in 1984 and a Doctorate in 1988.

Since 1988 she lectured at the University of Michigan. She was appointed a full Professor in 2012 and lectures in the Department of Sociology and the Programme in Women's Studies.

She was a signatory to the I apologize campaign in 2008, which demanded that Turkey takes responsibility for the massacres inflicted on the Armenian population in 1915.

Personal life 
Gökçek was named Fatma after her great-grandmother.

Works

References

University of Michigan faculty
Historians of the Armenian genocide
20th-century Turkish historians
Turkish sociologists
Turkish women sociologists
Living people
Year of birth missing (living people)
21st-century Turkish historians